James Biggar "Jerry" Weir (21 October 1851 – 22 December 1887) was a Scottish footballer, who played for Queen's Park and Scotland. Weir scored two goals in four appearances for Scotland. He also won the Scottish Cup three times with Queen's Park.

A joiner to trade, he emigrated to Australia, and died of typhoid fever while working on a railway construction project.

References

Sources

External links

London Hearts profile

1851 births
1889 deaths
Scottish footballers
Scotland international footballers
Queen's Park F.C. players
Footballers from Glasgow
Scottish emigrants to Australia
Association football forwards